Barringtonia chaniana is a species of woody plant in the family Lecythidaceae. It is found only in Pahang and Johor in Malaysia. It is found in lowlands and hill forests up to 570 m and is threatened by habitat loss.

References

chaniana
Endemic flora of Peninsular Malaysia
Trees of Peninsular Malaysia
Vulnerable plants
Taxonomy articles created by Polbot